Kevin McKay (born 24 May), is a Scottish DJ, electronic musician, record label owner and record producer now based in London.

History
McKay studied at The University of Strathclyde from 1989 to 1995. One night in 1991 while DJing at the University's student union he met Andy Carrick. The pair subsequently began collaborating on music together. Three years later McKay secured £2000 of funding from The Princes' Trust to release their music on his Muzique Tropique imprint. McKay continued to DJ in Glasgow throughout the 90s & 00s, holding residencies at clubs like Sub Club, The Tunnel, The Voodoo Room and The Apartment, promoting parties and inviting DJs like Francois Kevorkian, Roger Sanchez & Deep Dish to Glasgow.

In 1997, McKay founded Glasgow Underground Recordings. In the early days the label released music by Romanthony, DJ Sneak, Ashley Beedle, Milton Jackson, Mateo and Matos, Jersey Street as well as productions by McKay himself. Since its relaunch in 2011, the label has featured artists such as Basement Jaxx, Camelphat, Claptone, Danny Howard, Dixon, Illyus & Barrientos, Mihalas Safras, Kaz James, Flashmob & Optimo.

In 2001, McKay began working with Duncan Reid, a club promoter from Glasgow, who had previously hired him to DJ at The Tunnel. Reid was recording music as Linus Loves. McKay initially signed a track of Reid's to Glasgow Underground.

In 2002, McKay met Myles Macinnes better known by the stage name Mylo, founded Breastfed, a record label & publishing company, and signed Macinnes to it. In the same year he began producing the Linus Loves releases.

In 2003, McKay produced and mixed the Linus Loves single "Stand Back" (on this occasion recording under the pseudonym Brian Warner). It is a cover version of the 1983 Stevie Nicks' song. The track peaked at No. 31 on the UK Singles Chart in November 2003. McKay produced all of the Linus Loves output from 2002 to 2005.

Between 2004 and 2006 using the pseudonym Kevin Kennedy, McKay co-produced and mixed all of the Mylo material released on the Breastfed label including the UK-platinum album"Destroy Rock and Roll", the UK #3 hit "Doctor Pressure" and UK top-40 singles "Drop The Pressure", "In My Arms", "Muscle Car" and "Destroy Rock and Roll"  As well as his A&R and production work on the album, McKay was also responsible for running the label, managing all the UK release and world-wide licensing. As such, he secured a joint-venture deal with Sony and a publishing administration deal for Mylo with Universal Music Publishing.

In 2008, McKay signed Grum and a year later set up the Heartbeats imprint to release his music. Alongside Grum's manager, McKay A&R'd the album "Heartbeats" and all Grum's singles on the Heartbeats label from 2008 to 2014. As with Mylo, McKay ran the label, managing all the UK releases and world-wide licensing

In 2011, McKay re-launched Glasgow Underground Recordings. The label had been largely inactive since 2004. After years of collaborating & producing for others, McKay began concentrating on his solo work. His "Club World EP"  was his first release under his own name since 2001's "Freak Action". Andrew Rafter of harderbloggerfaster.com described those releases in 2011 as "warm, perfectly executed house." McKay's remix of Romanthony's "The Wanderer" reached number 14 in Music Week's Cool Cuts charts on 19 May 2011 and was described as a "brilliant rework".

In 2013, McKay entered the Beatport charts for the first time with his single "Ease Your Pain" on Stefano Ritteri's Congaloid label. The track peaked at number 23 in the Deep House chart.

In 2014, McKay released "Goin' Freak" on the Berlin-based label OFF Recordings. The single was supported on BBC Radio 1 by Pete Tong and reached number 4 in the DMC Buzz Chart and number 42 in the Beatport Tech House chart. At the end of the same year McKay began a collaboration with Toolroom Records. Their first release together was a compilation of Glasgow Underground's releases from 2014. As well as this, McKay released singles on Exploited and Noir.

In 2015, McKay continued to collaborate with Toolroom Records, releasing a single "Check It" that peaked at number 49 in the Beatport Deep House chart and a further 5 albums including a retrospective of Glasgow Underground's catalogue from 1997 to 2007, a best-of for the year and compilations celebrating the annual dance music events in Miami, Ibiza and Amsterdam.

In 2016, McKay returned to Glasgow Underground with the single releases "What You Gonna Do", "What U Want", "Balance Work" & "The Oooh Song". McKay continued to have his music supported on BBC Radio 1 with Annie Mac playing "What U Want", Pete Tong playing "Balance Work" and Monki playing "The Oooh Song". After two years of featuring in the charts on the DJ download stores, 2016 was the year McKay' reached the top of the charts with "The Oooh Song" reaching number 1 on Traxsource.com in May. Both it and  "What U Want" featured in the Traxsource.com Hype Chart for the year.

2017 saw McKay continue to expand the genres he produced releasing Progressive House (two singles with Grum, "Shooting Star" & "Dark Train" - both peaking at numbers 9 and 11 respectively in the Beatport Progressive House charts) as well as creating the genre-themed mix albums "Callisto" and "Callisto Volume 2" for Glasgow Underground. In addition to this style, he also released House ("Get A Room", "Crazy About You", "Everybody Get On The Floor", "You Got Me Down", "The Beat Goes On") and Nu-Disco ("Love Forever"). As well as singles, McKay released his first solo album, ("The Love Forever") on his own label, a move that prompted Mixmag.com to hail his Glasgow Underground imprint "a haven for great house music." He also featured in the end-of-year charts at Traxsource.com with the site naming him #19 in their top 100 House producers of 2017.

In 2018, McKay focussed on his House sound. His releases were now regularly featuring in the Beatport House charts and with "Get Get Down" (his and Matt Fontaine's version of the 1999 single by Paul Johnson) he began entering the Beatport Main Chart. He also hit the Main Chart with his remix of Start The Party's version of the Donna Summer classic "I Feel Love", a release that was supported by international DJs like Monki & Carl Cox. His releases continued to be successful on Traxsource.com, his collaboration with CASSIMM, "Love On My Mind", reaching the #1 spot in May. His previous support at BBC Radio 1 continued with DJs Annie Mac, Pete Tong, Danny Howard and Monki all supporting his releases. In addition to his own work, Glasgow Underground's releases were also featuring in the Beatport charts and in May they scored their first Beatport Number 1 with Andrew Meller's version of "Born Slippy". Shortly afterwards they were to become only the second label in the store's history to command both the #1 and #2 spots on the chart when PAX's "Electric Feel" joined Andrew Meller at the top in June. Meller's release would go on to be the store's #3 best-selling track of 2018.

The success of his recent house releases meant that by early 2019, the Beatport measuring site Beatstats.com rated Kevin McKay as the #2 house producer, worldwide, for the previous 12 months.

Discography

Bibliography

References

External links
Kevin McKay in TITEL kulturmagazin

Scottish DJs
Scottish electronic musicians
Scottish record producers
Living people
Electronic dance music DJs
Year of birth missing (living people)
Alumni of the University of Strathclyde
People educated at Largs Academy